Penny Stamper-Davis (born 2 March 1968) is a Canadian sailor. She competed at the 1992 Summer Olympics and the 1996 Summer Olympics.

References

External links
 

1968 births
Living people
Canadian female sailors (sport)
Olympic sailors of Canada
Sailors at the 1992 Summer Olympics – 470
Sailors at the 1996 Summer Olympics – 470
Sportspeople  from Carlisle, Cumbria